Rebolation is a style of Brazilian dance that originated in rave parties. The dance, which gained popularity after videos of people practicing the dance were uploaded to popular Internet video sharing websites, such as YouTube, is mainly danced to electronic music, and involves moving the arms and legs loosely while the correct footwork makes the dancer seem to slide on the floor.

When dancing Rebolation, several steps are used, and the main move is to "walk" putting a foot forward and using the heel as a pivot point to turn the back foot backwards, while the front foot is turned inwards around the heel. The reverse movement is used when walking backwards. This, when properly performed, gives the impression that the dancer is somewhat sliding on the floor, and the loose movements of the hands create the impression that the dancer is not totally in control of the direction of movement. 

This step dance is considered by many dancers as the Brazilian version of Melbourne Shuffle and Hard Style.

It is unknown which came first, but a similar type of dance that originated from Johannesburg, South Africa called "Stepping" or "Skitting" began in 2006. Unlike 'Rebolation', it did not originate through video sharing websites, such as YouTube, although some dancers have posted videos on the website.

Brazilian music
House music
Trance music
Dance in Brazil